Algerian Arab may refer to:

 Algerian Arab, also known as an Arab-Berber – someone of Arab descent in Algeria and the Maghreb
 Algerian Arab, a reference to the Algerian Arabic language (as in "Algerian Arab literature")
 Algerian Arab sheep, a breed of domestic livestock